Kassabis a surname, a variant of Qasab. Notable people with the surname include:

 Barbara Kassab-Every (1945−2013), Dutch artist  
 Jibrail Kassab (born 1938), bishop of the Chaldean Catholic Church in Australia
 Gilberto Kassab (born 1960), Brazilian politician, mayor of São Paulo
 May Kassab (born 1981), Egyptian singer
 Nimatullah Kassab (1808−1858), Lebanese monk, scholar and saint 
 Théophile Georges Kassab (1945−2013), Syrian Syriac Catholic archbishop
 Freddy Kassab, involved in the Fatal Vision controversy

See also
Kessab, or Kassab, a town in Syria
 Kasab (disambiguation)
 Qasab (disambiguation)

Arabic-language surnames